Liliana Ortega (born 1965) is a Venezuelan professor, and human rights lawyer and advocate. Her work as a human rights defender has earned her several awards, including the Ordre national du Mérite.

Biography
Liliana Ortega Mendoza was born in Caracas in 1965. She is the founder and executive director of the Comité de Familiares de Víctimas del Caracazo (COFAVIC) ("Family Committee of Victims of Caracazo"). Cofavic is a non-governmental organization (NGO) that works for the protection and promotion of human rights, independent of any partisan and religious doctrine or institution; it is a non-profit civil association. Her work focuses on the victims associated with Caracazo. Ortega teaches law at Andrés Bello Catholic University.

Awards and honors
 2017, Franco-German Prize for Human Rights and the Rule of Law
 2010, Officer, Ordre national du Mérite, granted by the Government of France
 1999, named as one of the fifty Leaders for the New Millennium in Latin America by Time magazine
 1999, ASHOKA fellow
 1994, nominated for the Reebok Human Rights Award

See also 

 Gonzalo Himiob
 Carlos Correa
 Rocío San Miguel

References

1965 births
People from Caracas
Venezuelan educators
Venezuelan human rights activists
Women human rights activists
Officers of the Ordre national du Mérite
Academic staff of Andrés Bello Catholic University
Venezuelan women lawyers
Living people
Venezuelan women educators
Ashoka Venezuela Fellows